Ansonia latirostra is a species of toads in the family Bufonidae. It likely occurs more widely.

Description
The habitus is slender. The dorsum is black, apart from a brown interscapular spot and brown reticulum. The flanks are also black apart from two brown spots. There is a small cream-colored spot below the eye.

Habitat and conservation
The species inhabits closed-canopy hill dipterocarp forests. It is associated with streams where animals have been found in vegetation overhanging the stream bed (≤2 m above the ground) or on the tops of large rocks along the edge of the stream. Habitat loss caused by logging and agricultural expansion is likely a threat to this species.

References

latirostra
Amphibians described in 2006
Amphibians of Malaysia
Endemic fauna of Malaysia